Ishwor Pokhrel is the current senior Vice-president of CPN (UML). Pokhrel has also served as the Deputy Prime Minister of Nepal. He was also Minister of Defence in the Second Oli cabinet. 

He also served as Minister for Industry, Commerce and Supplies. He was also Minister of Foreign Affairs from 20 May 2012 to 28 May 2012.

Published books 
'MAGH 19' (A book written about February 1 - The Royal take-over, 2005)

Electoral history

2017 legislative elections

2013 Constituent Assembly election

2008 Constituent Assembly election

1991 legislative elections

References

External links
 

Communist Party of Nepal (Unified Marxist–Leninist) politicians
Living people
1954 births
People from Okhaldhunga District
Nepal Communist Party (NCP) politicians
Nepal MPs 2017–2022
Government ministers of Nepal
Nepal MPs 1999–2002
Members of the National Assembly (Nepal)
Deputy Prime Ministers of Nepal